Jean-Jacques Gaultier (born July 13, 1963 in Épinal, Vosges) is a member of the National Assembly of France.  He represents the Vosges department, and is a member of the Republicans.  He was the deputy for Vosges's 4th constituency from 2002 to 2012 and again from 2017 onwards.

References

1963 births
Living people
People from Épinal
Union for a Popular Movement politicians
The Republicans (France) politicians
Deputies of the 12th National Assembly of the French Fifth Republic
Deputies of the 13th National Assembly of the French Fifth Republic
Deputies of the 15th National Assembly of the French Fifth Republic
Deputies of the 16th National Assembly of the French Fifth Republic
Mayors of places in Grand Est